Ugyen Ugyen (born 2 June 1974) is an archer who represented Bhutan internationally.

Ugyen competed for Bhutan in the women's individual event at the 1996 Summer Olympics in Atlanta; she finished 60th in the ranking round before being beaten by Olena Sadovnycha from Ukraine in the next round.

References

External links
 

1974 births
Living people
Olympic archers of Bhutan
Archers at the 1996 Summer Olympics
Bhutanese female archers